"Get a Job" is a song by the Silhouettes released in November 1957. It reached the number one spot on the Billboard pop and R&B singles charts in February 1958, and was later included in Robert Christgau's "Basic Record Library" of 1950s and 1960s recordings, published in Christgau's Record Guide: Rock Albums of the Seventies (1981). The song celebrates the virtues of securing gainful employment.

Background
"When I was in the service in the early 1950s and didn't come home and go to work, my mother said 'get a job' and basically that's where the song came from," said tenor Richard Lewis, who wrote the lyrics. The four members of the group shared the credit, jointly creating the "sha na na" and "dip dip dip dip" hooks later imitated by other doo-wop groups.

It was recorded at Robinson Recording Laboratories in Philadelphia in October 1957. Rollee McGill played the saxophone break, and the arranger was Howard Biggs. Intended as the B-side to "I Am Lonely", "Get a Job" was initially released on Kae Williams' Junior label; Williams, who was also a Philadelphia disc-jockey, was the Silhouettes' manager. Doug Moody, an executive at Ember Records, acquired the rights to the song for that label, where it was licensed for national distribution.

In early 1958, the Silhouettes performed "Get a Job" several times on American Bandstand and once on The Dick Clark Show, appearances that contributed to the song's success by exposing it to a large audience. Ultimately the single sold more than a million copies.

Personnel
Richard "Rick" Lewis - tenor vocals
Bill Horton - lead vocals
Earl T. Beal - baritone vocals
Raymond Edwards - bass vocals
Rollee McGill - saxophone
Howard Biggs - arrangements

Legacy
The song was later featured in the soundtracks of the movies American Graffiti (1973), Stand By Me (1986), Trading Places (1983), Get a Job (1985), Joey (1986), and Good Morning, Vietnam (1987). In the 1980s, the UK recruitment agency Brook Street Bureau used it in their two TV commercials, replacing the words "get a job" with "better job".

The revival group Sha Na Na derived their name from the song's doo-wop introduction. They performed it at Woodstock in 1969. Sha Na Na in return, though under the spelling "Xanana" became the nickname of former East Timorese President and Prime Minister José Alexandre Gusmão, better known as "Xanana Gusmão". "Get a Job" inspired a number of answer songs, including "Got a Job", the debut recording by The Miracles. Dennis Wilson, co-founder of the Beach Boys, believed that his group's song "She's Goin' Bald" (1967) paid homage to "Get a Job". Several bars of "Get a Job" are quoted at the start of "The Obvious Child," the first track on Paul Simon's album The Rhythm of the Saints.

The famous line "yep yep yep yep yep um um um um get a job" was used in an episode of Married... with Children (Al Bundy tells his son Bud what he should do to earn money).

Cover versions
Australian band Ol' 55 covered the song on their album Take It Greasy (1976). It was recorded by Jan Berry of Jan & Dean on his 1997 solo album Second Wave. Other versions include those by the Hampton String Quartet (What if Mozart Wrote "Roll Over Beethoven"?), Neil Young & Crazy Horse (Americana, 2012). and The Delltones. James Taylor did a rendition on his Other Covers album. The Mills Brothers (Dot Records 45-15695) 1958.

Television and film
In the 1984 "You and the Horse You Rode In On" episode 7 of season 2 of the TV series Hardcastle and McCormick, at 11 minutes and 2 seconds, this song is played during the sequence in which the character Mark McCormick is walking the streets in search of employment.

Note

See also
 List of 1950s one-hit wonders in the United States

References

1958 singles
Billboard Top 100 number-one singles
Cashbox number-one singles
1957 songs
Doo-wop songs